Captain Sir Robert Henry Muirhead Collins  (1852–1927) was an English-born Royal Navy officer, Colonial (Permanent Victorian Naval Forces) naval officer, Colonial public servant, Australian Federationist, Australian public service department head and Australia's official representative in London.

Life summary

Collins was born to Dr Charles Howell Collins, a surgeon, and his Henrietta Jane Heaven (née Groset). Collins died in 1927 and was survived by his wife and their son, Major Howel Collins (graduated from Royal Military Academy in Woolwich) of the Australian Army.

References

External links
Olwen Prike (1984) Australia House: A Little Australia in London, Backburning, pp. 163–171,254–256. www.api-network.com
Lieutenant Robert Henry Muirhead Collins, Victorian Navy. www.cerberus.com.au

1852 births
1927 deaths
Secretaries of the Australian Department of Defence
Knights Commander of the Order of St Michael and St George
Royal Navy officers
People from Bath and North East Somerset